The 2019 Sud Ladies Cup (officially ) was the second edition of the Sud Ladies Cup women's football tournament.

It was held in the region of Provence-Alpes-Côte d'Azur from 8 to 18 May 2019. In this season, the tournament was contested by under-19 national teams.

North Korea won their first title without conceding a goal.

Participants
Six participating teams were announced in March 2019.

AFC
 (1st participation)
 (1st participation)
CAF
 (1st participation)

CONCACAF
 (2nd participation)
 (1st participation)
UEFA
 (2nd participation)

Squads

Venues
A total of four cities hosted the tournament.

Match officials
The referees were:

 Victoria Beyer
Assistants: Camille Soriano, Stéphanie di Benedetto and Romy Fournier
 Raïssa Matamba
Assistants: Préssilia Nho Ndong and Richie Nganda

 Judith Ambroise
Assistants:Ebernise Louis and Wesline Louis
 Haruna Kanematsu
Assistants: Mio Ogata and Saki Nakamoto

Format
The six invited teams played a round-robin tournament. The teams were ranked according to points (3 points for a win, 1 point for a draw, and 0 points for a loss). If at the end of a match it ended in a draw, an additional point would be given to the winner of a penalty shoot-out. If tied on points, head-to-head match would be used to determine the ranking.

Results

Statistics

Goalscorers

MVP of the game

Awards
After the final, the following players were rewarded for their performances during the competition.

Best player:  Silvana Flores
Best goalkeeper:  Yu Son-gum
Topscorer:  Kim Kyong-yong
Fair play:

Sud Ladies Cup 2019 best XI
The best XI team was a squad consisting of the eleven most impressive players at the tournament.

See also
2019 Toulon Tournament

References

External links 
 Sud Ladies Cup

2019 in women's association football
2019 in youth association football
2018–19 in French women's football
May 2019 sports events in France
Sud Ladies Cup